Aleksandr Mikhailovich Yurkevich (22 May 1942 – 25 June 2011) was a Greco-Roman wrestler from Russia who won a European title in 1967 and a world title in 1969.

References

1942 births
2011 deaths
Soviet male sport wrestlers
Russian male sport wrestlers